Godonela was a genus of moths in the family Geometridae. It is now considered a synonym of Semiothisa, though many of the species formerly placed here are now in Chiasmia

Species
 Godonela aestimaria (Hübner, 1809)
 Godonela albibrunnea Warren 
 Godonela albipuncta (Warren, 1894)
 Godonela avitusaria (Walker, 1860)
 Godonela bornusaria Holloway, 1993
 Godonela eleonora (Cramer, [1780])
 Godonela emersaria (Walker, 1861)
 Godonela fluidata (Warren, 1897)
 Godonela glareosa (Turner, 1917)
 Godonela goldiei (Druce, 1882)
 Godonela gratularia (Walker, 1861)
 Godonela hygies (Prout, 1932)
 Godonela hypomochla (Turner, 1917)
 Godonela margaritis (Meyrick, 1892)
 Godonela mutabilis (Warren, 1897)
 Godonela nora (Walker, 1861)
 Godonela ozararia (Walker, 1860)
 Godonela pluviata (Fabricius, 1798)
 Godonela rectistrigaria (Herrich-Schäffer, [1854])
 Godonela suriens (Strand, 1912)
 Godonela syriacaria (Staudinger, 1871)
 Godonela tessellata (Warren, 1899)
 Godonela translineata (Walker, 1866)
 Godonela vacuna (Druce, 1889)
 Godonela variegata (Warren, 1896)

References

External links

Macariini
Obsolete arthropod taxa